was a Japanese samurai of the Akamatsu clan during the Muromachi Period.

Early life
Mitsusuke was the son of Akamatusu Yoshinori.

Assassin
In 1441, Mitsusuke killed Ashikaga Yoshinori who was leader of the Ashikaga shogunate.

In response, he was attacked by forces of the Yamana clan and the Hosokawa clan.  In defeat, he was forced to commit suicide.

References

Daimyo
Suicides by seppuku
1381 births
1441 deaths
Forced suicides